Traian "Cazacu" Cazan (born October 22, 1958) is a Romanian former ice hockey player. He played for the Romania men's national ice hockey team at the 1980 Winter Olympics in Lake Placid.

References

1958 births
Living people
Ice hockey players at the 1980 Winter Olympics
Olympic ice hockey players of Romania
Romanian ice hockey left wingers
Sportspeople from Bucharest
Steaua Rangers players